Major Fernando Luis Ribas-Dominicci (June 24, 1952 – April 15, 1986), was an F-111F pilot in the United States Air Force. He was killed in action during Operation El Dorado Canyon, the April 15, 1986, U.S. air raid on Libya.

Early years
Ribas-Dominicci was born in the town of Utuado, in the mountains of Puerto Rico where he received his primary and secondary education.  As a child, he had always dreamed of becoming a pilot and after he graduated from high school, he entered the University of Puerto Rico at Mayaguez where he earned his bachelor's degree in civil engineering. As a student in the university, he was a member of the campus' ROTC program and upon graduation was commissioned a second lieutenant in the U.S. Air Force.

Military career
Ribas-Dominicci was assigned to Cannon Air Force Base, in New Mexico, where he received advanced training as a General Dynamics F-111 combat pilot. By 1983, Ribas-Dominicci was a captain and the  recipient of the Air Force Commendation Medal. In 1985, he completed his master's degree in aeronautical science at the Embry-Riddle Aeronautical University in Daytona Beach, Florida, United States.

Operation El Dorado Canyon

On April 15, 1986, in response to acts of terrorism sponsored by Libyan leader Muammar al-Gaddafi, the United States attacked key terrorist training facilities in Tripoli, Libya, using 18 USAF F-111F fighter-bombers and 5 EF-111A radar jamming aircraft from bases in England. The attack was code-named Operation El Dorado Canyon.  This was part of a joint strike mission in coordination with US Navy aircraft which struck targets in Behghazi, Libya, at the same time. Major Ribas-Dominicci was one of the pilots who participated in the air raid as member of the 48th Tactical Fighter Wing.  His F-111F was shot down in action over the disputed Gulf of Sidra off the Libyan coast.  Ribas-Dominicci and his weapon systems officer, Captain Paul F. Lorence, were the only U.S. casualties of the mission.

Aftermath
On December 25, 1988, after years of denying that they had the bodies of the two crew members, Gaddafi offered to release the body of Lorence to his family through Pope John Paul II. The body recovered and thought to be that of Lorence was actually that of then-Captain Fernando L. Ribas-Domminici, which was identified by dental records and returned in 1989.

The Libyan government has denied that it holds Lorence's remains and the U.S government does not believe that they are hiding anything. Major Fernando Luis Ribas-Dominicci's remains are buried in his hometown of Utuado.

Honors and legacy

Both men's names are engraved in the F-111 "Vark" Memorial Park located in Clovis, New Mexico.  Ribas-Dominicci was awarded the Purple Heart and posthumously promoted to the rank of major, effective April 15, 1986.

To honor his memory, the Government of Puerto Rico renamed the Isla Grande Airport in San Juan to Fernando Ribas Dominicci Airport. The City of Utuado honored the pilot by naming a main avenue as Fernando Ribas-Dominicci Avenue.  A monument in Ribas-Dominicci's honor, simulating an F-111, has been placed at the entrance of Utuado. Ribas-Dominicci's name is engraved in El Monumento de la Recordación (Spanish: Monument of Remembrance) dedicated to Puerto Rico's fallen soldiers and situated in front of the Capitol Building in San Juan, Puerto Rico.

Awards and decorations
Among Major Ribas-Dominicci's military decorations were the following:

Notes

See also

 List of Puerto Ricans
 Corsican immigration to Puerto Rico
List of Puerto Rican military personnel
Hispanics in the United States Air Force
University of Puerto Rico at Mayaguez people

References

Further reading
Puertorriquenos Who Served With Guts, Glory, and Honor. Fighting to Defend a Nation Not Completely Their Own; by Greg Boudonck;

External links

  Captain Paul Lorence: An American Patriot Left Behind, In 2001, Lorence's lifelong friend, reference librarian Theodore D. Karantsalis, enlisted the aid of Congressman Wally Herger's office to urge Libya to return Lorence's remains on behalf of his family and friends. The Paul Lorence web blog (posted above) was started in 2005 to get the word out around the 20th anniversary of the raid.

1952 births
1986 deaths
Aviators killed by being shot down
Embry–Riddle Aeronautical University alumni
People from Utuado, Puerto Rico
Puerto Rican military officers
Puerto Rican people of Corsican descent
Puerto Rican United States Air Force personnel
Recipients of the Air Medal
United States Air Force officers
United States Air Force reservists
American military personnel killed in action